Trazium (EGYT-3,615) is an antidepressant drug which was never marketed. It has psychostimulant-like effects and its actions appear to be mediated by the dopaminergic and adrenergic systems.  It was formulated as a salt with ethanesulfonic acid and given the generic name trazium esilate (INN).

References 

Antidepressants
Stimulants
Triazines
Chloroarenes
Quaternary ammonium compounds
Abandoned drugs